is a private junior college located in Hachinohe, Aomori Prefecture, Japan. It was established in 1971, and is now attached to Hachinohe Gakuin University.

Departments
Early Childhood Education
Life Design
Nursing

See also
 List of junior colleges in Japan
 Hachinohe Gakuin University

External links
 Hachinohe Junior College

Private universities and colleges in Japan
Japanese junior colleges
Universities and colleges in Aomori Prefecture
Hachinohe